Metiria Leanne Agnes Stanton Turei (born 1970) is a New Zealand academic and a former New Zealand politician. She was a Member of Parliament from 2002 to 2017 and the female co-leader of the Green Party of Aotearoa New Zealand from 2009 to 2017. Turei resigned from the co-leader position on 9 August 2017 amid a political controversy arising from her admission to lying to the Ministry of Social Development to receive higher payments when she was on the Domestic Purposes Benefit and later, to being enrolled to vote in an electorate where she was not eligible when she was 23. 

She was the Green Party spokesperson on Inequality, Justice, and Building and Housing. She resigned as co-leader of the Green Party and a list candidate immediately prior to the 2017 general election and retired from politics.

Early years
Metiria Turei grew up in a working-class Māori family in Palmerston North in the North Island. She is of Ngāti Kahungunu and Āti Hau nui a Pāpārangi descent. She failed her high school examinations and in 1987 she worked her first job as a kitchen-hand at the Hard Rock Café in Palmerston North working the late shift. Between 1989 and 1991, Turei was the Tumuaki ("Head") of Te Iwi Maori Rawakore o Aotearoa and involved with Te Roopu Rawakore o Aotearoa. Turei was a founding member of the Random Trollops performance art troupe. She studied law at the University of Auckland and later worked as a commercial lawyer at Simpson Grierson.

Political career
She was a candidate for the McGillicuddy Serious Party in the 1993 election, for the Aotearoa Legalise Cannabis Party in the 1996 election and for McGillicuddy Serious again in the 1999 election. In 2001 she stood as the Green Party candidate for Mayor of Auckland, finishing a distant fifth with 2.05% of the vote.

Member of Parliament

In the 2002 general election, the Green Party received 7.00% of the vote, which allowed them 9 seats in Parliament. When she was elected, Turei left her job as a corporate lawyer for Simpson Grierson to become a Member of Parliament.

2005–2008
In 2009, Turei's Misuse of Drugs (Medicinal Cannabis) Amendment Bill was drawn from the member's ballot.  The bill received a conscience vote at its first reading, but was defeated 84–34.  Later that year, her Liquor Advertising (Television and Radio) Bill was also drawn, but it too was defeated.

In 2008 she was ranked 4th on the Green Party's list and stood in the Dunedin North electorate. She lost the election in Dunedin North to Labour's Pete Hodgson, finishing third with 11.09% of the vote. However she was returned to parliament due to her high ranking on the Green Party list.

2008–2011
On 30 May 2009 Turei was elected as the fourth co-leader (and second female co-leader) of the Green Party. In line with Green Party policy, there must be both a male and a female co-leader. She was elected ahead of veteran MP Sue Bradford, who had had three private member's bills passed by then.

In July 2009 Turei's Marine Animals Protection Law Reform Bill, intended to strengthen protection for dolphins and other marine mammals, was drawn from the member's ballot. The bill was defeated at its first reading later that month.

In September 2009 Turei led the Green campaign opposing the government's plans to allow mining in New Zealand's national parks. Her Crown Minerals (Protection of Public Conservation Land Listed in the Fourth Schedule) Amendment Bill, which aimed to strengthen the protection for national parks, was drawn from the member's ballot in April 2010.

2011–2014
In October 2012 her Criminal Proceeds (Recovery) Act 2009 (Application to Casinos) Amendment bill was drawn from the ballot. Before its first reading however, National, ACT and United Future said they would not be voting for it.

Turei, along with the rest of the Green Party, voted in support of Marriage (Definition of Marriage) Amendment Act 2013, allowing same-sex couples to legally marry in New Zealand.

2017 general election

During the 2017 election campaign, Turei publicly stated during an interview on TVNZ's Q+A Show that the New Zealand First leader Winston Peters "was on a roll partly because of a very racist approach to immigration." Her comments triggered fierce criticism from Peters and NZ First Deputy Leader Tracey Martin, who rejected Turei's claims and warned that there would be consequences for the Greens in any post-election talks with NZ First. Turei refused to apologise and reiterated that the Greens were still committed to negotiating a coalition deal with NZ First following the election.

On 16 July 2017, during the launch of the Green Party's 2017 election campaign, Turei admitted to benefit fraud over a period of three years in the early 1990s, stating that she had not disclosed to Work and Income New Zealand that she was accepting rent from flatmates. Turei justified her action on the grounds that she and her young daughter depended on the Domestic Purposes Benefit to survive. During the campaign, Turei advocated raising the domestic purposes benefit for solo parents and low-income families. Turei's disclosure attracted polarising responses from other politicians, the New Zealand media, and blogosphere, and criticism from Social Development Minister Anne Tolley, Labour Party leader Andrew Little, and media commentators Barry Soper and Patrick Gower. The left-wing journalist Chris Trotter and blogger Martyn Bradbury spoke out in support of her, faulting what they considered Work and Income's "punitive" treatment of beneficiaries. When the next Colmar Brunton poll came out covering the period 22 to 27 July, the Green vote had surged to 15%, with some of the support coming from Labour which had fallen to 24%. The low ratings caused Little to resign the Labour Party leadership on 1 August.

The right-wing pressure group New Zealand Taxpayers' Union announced it would invoice her $57,000 in damages but she said it was a political stunt and she would not respond. Some beneficiaries and anti-poverty advocacy groups spoke in support of Turei and she said she had spoken with other beneficiaries who had been withholding information about their benefit status from Work and Income. Turei also advocated an amnesty on beneficiaries, while acknowledging that she had not been aware of an amnesty instituted during the 1990s. On 26 July 2017, Turei announced that she would be meeting with the Ministry of Social Development's investigative unit to calculate how much she would pay back in compensation. It was then revealed that in 1993 Turei had been enrolled to vote at the same address as her child's father. Turei denied living with the father, which would have disqualified her eligibility for the domestic purposes benefit. She stated that she had enrolled at that address in order to vote for a friend; such conduct constitutes an offence under the Electoral Act.

On 7 August 2017, Green Party MPs David Clendon and Kennedy Graham announced that they were planning to resign as Green Party candidates for the 2017 election, due to the fraud revelations and Turei's handling of the resulting situation. Both Clendon and Graham resigned from the party caucus the following day, after the party made moves to remove them.

Turei resigned as co-leader of the Green Party and as a list candidate for the 2017 election on 9 August 2017, saying that the "scrutiny on [her] family has become unbearable." She stated that her intention was to not return to Parliament after the election. Not being on the list meant that, if she failed to win the electorate of Te Tai Tonga where she was standing, she would not return to Parliament after the election. During August, the Green party fell in opinion polls to around the 5% threshold, below which there wouldn't be representation in Parliament, and Labour's new leader, Jacinda Ardern, generated such a turnaround that by the end of the month, Labour overtook National in the ratings. In its 26 August edition, the New Zealand Listener summarised the situation as follows:

The media outcry over the case and extensive coverage given to the benefit fraud by the mainstream media in New Zealand has led to claims of political agendas being promoted by the media. Specifically the case has been contrasted with that of Bill English (and the relative lack of media and public "outrage"), and to a lesser extent, that of John Key.

According to The Spinoff journalist Madeleine Chapman, Turei's resignation had come as a result of Ardern sending two members of her team, rumoured to be Grant Robertson and her chief of staff Neale Jones, to inform Greens co-leader Shaw and his team that Ardern would not be giving Turei a cabinet or ministerial position within a potential Labour government. As a face–saving measure, Turei had organised her own press conference where she announced that she would not ask for a ministerial position in a Labour–led government but would remain co-leader of the Greens until the 2017 election.

During the 2017 election, Turei contested the Te Tai Tonga Māori electorate (which covers Wellington and the entire South Island). She was defeated by Labour's candidate Rino Tirikatene and retired from politics.

Electoral history

Life after politics 
In October 2018, Metiria Turei gave her first interview since leaving politics. During the interview, she revealed that she is studying art at the Dunedin School of Art, and has work entered in a group show "wā o mua" at the Blue Oyster Art Project Space in Dunedin. Her futurist art collection tūruapō was exhibited at The Wallace Arts Centre in Auckland in 2021.

She is currently (2022) a lecturer in law at the University of Otago.

Personal life
Metiria Turei has a daughter, Piupiu Turei, and is married to Warwick Stanton. In February 2014, Turei and her husband were living in Waitati, close to the shore of Blueskin Bay, a coastal estuary to the north of Dunedin. She is also a performing arts enthusiast and participated in a performing group called Random Trollops and medieval reenactments at her Blueskin Bay home. Turei also wore Adrienne Winkelmann jackets, which elicited criticism from several National Party MPs including Judith Collins.

Notes

References

Further reading

External links

Profile at Green Party
Profile at New Zealand Parliament website

1970 births
Living people
Green Party of Aotearoa New Zealand MPs
New Zealand women activists
20th-century New Zealand lawyers
Women members of the New Zealand House of Representatives
Green Party of Aotearoa New Zealand co-leaders
Māori MPs
Ngāti Kahungunu people
People from Palmerston North
Aotearoa Legalise Cannabis Party politicians
McGillicuddy Serious Party politicians
New Zealand list MPs
Māori politicians
Unsuccessful candidates in the 1993 New Zealand general election
Unsuccessful candidates in the 1996 New Zealand general election
Unsuccessful candidates in the 1999 New Zealand general election
Members of the New Zealand House of Representatives
21st-century New Zealand politicians
21st-century New Zealand women politicians
Unsuccessful candidates in the 2017 New Zealand general election
New Zealand Māori women lawyers
Politicians from Dunedin
Academic staff of the University of Otago
University of Auckland alumni